The 17057 / 17058 Devagiri Express is an Express train service operated by the South Central Railway zone of Indian Railways. The train runs between Mumbai and Secunderabad, Hyderabad, primarily running on Secunderabad–Manmad section via Kalyan Junction, Nashik Road, Manmad, Aurangabad, Jalna, Parbhani, Nanded and Nizamabad. The train shares its rakes with Simhapuri Express Gudur and Secunderabad.

History

The train started as a daily train between Mumbai and Aurangabad. Devagiri, Devgiri or Deogiri is the ancient name of the town of Daulatabad near Aurangabad. Devagiri was once the capital of India during Muhammad bin Tughluq's rule who shifted his capital from New Delhi to Devagiri and back to New Delhi, this is where the name of the service originates.

The train was later extended to Nanded and then till Nizamabad and presently runs up to Secunderabad.

The train covers its distance of 877 kilometers from Mumbai to Secunderabad in 17 hr 20 m with an average speed of 51 km/h (31.68 mph).

The train links Nashik with Hyderabad for Trimbakeshwar one of jyotirlingas also; other jyotirlinga is Grishneshwar at Ellora near Aurangabad.

The train numbers are 17057DN Mumbai–Secunderabad Devagiri Express and 17058UP Secunderabad–Mumbai Devagiri Express.

This train runs on the historical railway track of Hyderabad–Godavari Valley Railways funded by Nizam of Hyderabad.

Powering
The train is hauled by an AC/DC electric loco WCAM-3 of Kalyan shed from Mumbai to Manmad, from where an EMD diesel locomotive WDP of pune and gooty shed takes over. In the return direction, the diesel hauls the train from Secunderabad to Manmad Station.

Route & halts

Traction
Both train are hauled by a Gooty-based WDP-4D diesel locomotive from Secunderabad till , after which a Bhusawal-based WAP-4 electric locomotive power the train to its reminder journey until Mumbai CSMT, and vice versa.

Rake sharing
The train shares its rake with 12709/12710 Simhapuri Express.

Timetable

Gallery

See also
 Ajanta Express
 Hussainsagar Express
 Simhapuri Express

References

External links

Transport in Mumbai
Transport in Secunderabad
Named passenger trains of India
Rail transport in Telangana
Rail transport in Maharashtra
Express trains in India